HMS Superb was a 60-gun fourth rate ship of the line of the Royal Navy, built to the 1733 proposals of the 1719 Establishment of dimensions at Woolwich Dockyard, and launched on 27 August 1736.

A collection of letters from Captain Thomas Sanders at the Navy Historical Center in Washington D. C. shows Superb took part in the siege of Louisbourg (1745) as the flagship of Commodore Peter Warren "Commanding His Majesty's Ships in the North Atlantic" under command of Captain Tiddeman.

Superb was broken up in 1757.

Notes

References

 Lavery, Brian (2003) The Ship of the Line - Volume 1: The development of the battlefleet 1650-1850. Conway Maritime Press. .
 Letters to Captain Thomas Saunders and other documents related to the conduct of the Lewisburg (Louisbourg) Campaign of 1745, 29 October 1730 - October 1780, Department of the Navy - Navy Historical Center, Washington D.C.

External links
 

Ships of the line of the Royal Navy
1730s ships